Lao Chongguang (1802–67) was a Chinese official during the Qing dynasty and a native of Changsha County, Changsha, Hunan.

Personal life
His grandson is the Doctor of Philosophy Lao Sze-Kwang.

Political career
Lao Chongguang was considered an eminent official, as he had scored impressively high on the jinshi, the imperial examination. On October 7, 1859, Lao Chongguang was appointed governor general of Liangguang. In March 1860, Lao met with Harry Smith Parkes, the British consul in Guangzhou, and leased Kowloon and Stonecutters Island to the United Kingdom.

See also
Convention for the Extension of Hong Kong Territory
Zhang GuoLiang

References

Draft History of Qing

|-

|-

1802 births
1867 deaths
Politicians from Changsha
Qing dynasty politicians from Hunan
Political office-holders in Guangdong
Political office-holders in Yunnan
Viceroys of Yun-Gui
Viceroys of Liangguang